Colleen Loach (born April 10, 1983) is a Canadian equestrian who competes in the sport of eventing. Loach won a bronze medal as part of the Canadian eventing team at the 2015 Pan American Games in Toronto.

In July 2016, she was named to Canada's Olympic team. At the Games held in Rio de Janeiro, Brazil, Loach placed 10th in the team competition and finished 42nd individually, collecting 145.70 penalties across the three phases aboard the Selle Français gelding Qorry Blue d'Argogues.

Loach and Qorry Blue d'Argouges returned to the Olympics in 2021, when they placed 28th individually.

CCI 5* Results

International Championship Results

References

External links
 
 

1983 births
Living people
Canadian female equestrians
Equestrians at the 2015 Pan American Games
Equestrians at the 2019 Pan American Games
Pan American Games silver medalists for Canada
Sportspeople from Sherbrooke
Equestrians at the 2016 Summer Olympics
Olympic equestrians of Canada
Pan American Games medalists in equestrian
Medalists at the 2015 Pan American Games
Medalists at the 2019 Pan American Games
Equestrians at the 2020 Summer Olympics
20th-century Canadian women
21st-century Canadian women